The Boys' 5000 metre walk competition at the 2018 Summer Youth Olympics was held on 11 and 15 October, at the Parque Polideportivo Roca.

Schedule 
All times are in local time (UTC-3).

Results

Stage 1

Stage 2

Final placing

External links
Stage 1 results 
Stage 2 results 
Final Placing 
 

Athletics at the 2018 Summer Youth Olympics